Equinox (Terrance Sorenson) is a fictional character, a supervillain appearing in American comic books published by Marvel Comics.

Publication history
Equinox, the Thermodynamic Man, first appeared in Marvel Team-Up #23 (July 1974), and was created by Len Wein and Gil Kane. He also appeared in Giant-Size Spider-Man #1, also in July 1974, and a two-part story in Marvel Team-Up #59-60 (July–Aug. 1977).

After a nearly 20-year hiatus, the character appeared sporadically, appearing in Marvel Comics Presents #147 (Feb. 1994), Code of Honor #1 (Jan. 1997), Spider-Man Unlimited #12 vol. 2 (Jan. 2006), and Heroes for Hire vol. 2 #1 (Oct. 2006). A Skrull impersonator of Equinox appeared in Avengers: The Initiative #12 (June 2008) and #18.

Equinox received an entry in the All-New Official Handbook of the Marvel Universe A-Z #4 (2006).

Fictional character biography
Equinox is an African-American youth who gained superhuman powers due to accidental exposure to his father's malfunctioning equipment after a lab accident (his mother is Margay Sorenson, head of natural sciences at Bard College).

Equinox's powers were similar to the combined abilities of superheroes the Human Torch and Iceman, with whom he first battled, as well as enhanced strength and durability. He engages in conflict with the superheroes Spider-Man, Yellowjacket, and the Wasp, during which his origin was revealed, the three heroes managing to apparently cure him using technology conceived by his mother and constructed in the Baxter Building while the Fantastic Four were away.

Years later, he fights the Falcon. Afterwards, Equinox joined Vil-Anon, a twelve-step program dedicated to helping individuals overcome their criminal tendencies.

Equinox appears during the Civil War event, and when the registration law is announced, he wants to leave the country again. He contacts Vienna to make him a new fake identity, but unbeknownst to him, Vienna  secretly works for Heroes for Hire who  apprehend Equinox and several other supervillains.

Equinox is next seen as a member of the Montana team of the Fifty State Initiative, Freedom Force, alongside Challenger, Cloud 9, Think Tank, and Spinner.

During the Secret Invasion storyline, Equinox was revealed to be a Skrull infiltrator and attacked his teammates. The Skrull-Equinox not only had the abilities of Firestar and Iceman to match the real Equinox' powers, he also had some of Spider-Man's abilities. He froze Hardball, Ryder and Riot (of the Skrull Kill Krew) in ice and broke the glass over Think Tank's brain. The Skrull-Equinox was sniped in the head by Cloud 9 using adamantium bullets.

After the invasion is over, the real Equinox is seen, although miscolored, in a support group meeting with the others that had been replaced by Skrulls. Equinox has since retaken active service with the Freedom Force. Due to his criminal past, Norman Osborn chooses his team between the ones assembled by Stark to help some other Initiative teams to apprehend the seceding Heavy Hitters team.

At the start of the Ends of the Earth storyline, Equinox is on a rampage. To defeat him, Spider-Man uses his own version of Green Goblin's glider and bombs.

Following the Avengers vs. X-Men storyline, Equinox participates in a prison riot. Mimic and Rogue respond to the riot. Copying the powers of Equinox, Armadillo, and Man-Bull, Mimic and Rogue stop the riot.

Equinox returns in the All-New, All-Different Marvel when he is brainwashed by Kang the Conqueror's splintered half Mister Gryphon to attack the Avengers. Mister Gryphon creates multiple temporal replicas of Equinox by having his future selves aid him in his assault. However, he is defeated when Spider-Man pretends to be under Kang's influence so that he can identify the earliest version of Equinox present as the only one surprised at his conversion and then knock him out, eliminating all the future Equinoxes as well.

Powers and abilities
Equinox possesses both pyrokinesis and cryokinesis as well as superhuman strength and durability. He continually undergoes "thermal transitions" so that part of his body is always aflame and part of his body is covered with ice. The strain of these powers has driven him increasingly insane over time.

In other media

Video games
 Equinox appears in Marvel: Ultimate Alliance 2, voiced by Jimmie Wood. He is shown injected with a controlling nanite and unleashed upon the heroes when they infiltrate Prison 42.

References

External links
 Equinox at Marvel.com
 
 Equinox at Marvel Wiki

Characters created by Gil Kane
Characters created by Len Wein
Comics characters introduced in 1974
Fictional African-American people
Fictional characters with fire or heat abilities
Fictional characters with ice or cold abilities
Fictional characters with superhuman durability or invulnerability
Marvel Comics characters with superhuman strength
Marvel Comics mutates
Marvel Comics supervillains